Rex Geard (10 January 1927 – 22 July 1982) was  a former Australian rules footballer who played with Richmond in the Victorian Football League (VFL).

Notes

External links 		
		
		
		
		
		
		
		
1927 births		
1982 deaths		
Australian rules footballers from Tasmania		
Richmond Football Club players
Sandy Bay Football Club players